7th & Hope is a musical duo composed of founding members, American singer-songwriter, Patricia Bahia, and English singer-songwriter, Betty Lawrence.  Their songs, "Great Day To Be Alive" and "Keep The Light On", have been recognized with a Positive Music Award and a Peace Song Award in 2019, The WCS International Songwriting Contest Grand Prize in 2018, and as a finalist in the John Lennon Songwriting Contest in 2017 and 2018. Their songs have been featured on Netflix, The Hallmark Channel, and MTV, among others.

Songs in film and television

Awards

|-
| 2019 ||"Keep The Light On" || Peace Song Award || 
|-
| 2019 ||"Keep The Light On" || Positive Music Award || 
|-
| 2019 ||"Everything's Gonna Be Alright" || Positive Music Award || 
|-
| 2018 ||"Great Day To Be Alive" || WCS Int'l Songwriting Contest Grand Prize || 
|-

References

American musical duos
American women pop singers
American women singer-songwriters
English women pop singers
English women singer-songwriters
Musical groups from Los Angeles